Sortase A (SrtA, SrtA protein, SrtA sortase) is an enzyme. This enzyme catalyses a cell wall sorting reaction, in which a surface protein with a sorting signal containing a LPXTG motif, is cleaved between the Thr and Gly residue.

This enzyme belongs to the peptidase family C60.

Structure 
Sortase A has an eight stranded β-barrel fold with a hydrophobic cleft formed by β7-β8 strands. This cleft is surrounded by β3-β4, β2-β3, β6-β7, and β7-β8 loops. The catalytic cysteine residue is found in this cleft and accepts subsequent binding of a nucleophilic agent. The β3-β4 loop contains a calcium binding site which binds calcium via coordination to a residue in the β6-β7 loop. Such binding slows down the motion of the β6-β7 loop, allowing the substrate of Sortase to bind and increase its activity eightfold.

Use in protein engineering 
Sortase A has been widely used as an in vitro tool to post-translationally modify proteins at the N- and C-termini with an appended label. These labels include biotin, fluorophores, crosslinkers, and multifunctional probes.

In both cases, one molecule is engineered to contain a LPXTG motif at one end and another molecule is engineered to contain a (Gly)n motif at another end. Upon cleavage of the LPXTG motif, Sortase forms a thioester intermediate with the engineered molecule. This intermediate is then resolved by nucleophilic attack by the (Gly)n containing molecule to form a fusion between the two molecules with an intervening LPXT(Gly)n motif.

To achieve N-terminal labeling of a protein, the LPXTG motif is engineered to be at the C-terminus of the label. The protein is engineered to have an N-terminal (Gly)n. To achieve C-terminal labeling of the same protein, the LPXTG motif is engineered to be at the C-terminus of the protein. A (Gly)n molecule is engineered to contain the label at its C-terminus.

Finally, both N and C-termini of proteins can be labeled by using Sortases of different substrate specificity. For example, Sortase A from streptococcus pyogenes, recognizes and cleaves the LPXTA motif and accepts Ala-based nucleophiles. This SrtA also recognizes and cleaves the LPXTG motif with reduced efficiency. However, Staph. A. Sortase A does not recognize LPXTA substrates and thus are orthogonal to the LPXTA sequence.

In addition, Sortase A has also been used to piecewise create proteins, protein domains, and peptides.

References

External links 
 

EC 3.4.22